A longphort (Ir. plur. longphuirt) is a term used in Ireland for a Viking ship enclosure or shore fortress. Although these longphorts were used as bases for Viking raids, the term had additional meanings and these sites had multiple purposes. The reason it cannot be assumed that longphorts were solely for military purposes as that would assume that there were always large numbers of Vikings at these settlements, which is not true. These camps were fortified areas along rivers, usually at a tributary where both sides were protected such that the Vikings could port ships. The sites were easily defended, sheltered, and gave immediate access to the sea. These camps would be of great importance to the Vikings during their raids of Ireland, which included attacks on many churches and monasteries located on the coast. It can be assumed that the purpose of these sites was to ease travel and trade within the region. Longphorts were essential to the economic prosperity of the Vikings. For example, it is clear that the earliest settlements became major trading centers throughout Ireland. Archeological evidence shows that imports and exports included textiles, animal skins, amber, and glass from England. During this time, the Vikings were able to begin a period of extremely profitable trade. Overall, the longphort settlements were essential in establishing the presence of the Vikings in Ireland during the ninth and tenth centuries.

Origins 
The word was first used in the 840s in the Irish account of The Annals of Ulster and in the Frankish account in the Annals of St. Bertin with the establishment of Viking encampments at Linn Duachaill and Dublin. It also describes new Viking settlements established at Waterford in 914 and Limerick in 922 possibly by the Uí Ímair. Many camps along river banks and lakes did not last long, however, some only as little as one or two seasons, but others such as Dublin developed into large urban centers, as did the other significant Norse settlements at Cork, Waterford, Woodstown (in Waterford), Wexford and Limerick which remain the largest urban centers in Ireland today.

Terminology 
The term longphort, or longphuit in Irish as seen in the annals, literally translates to “ship camp”. This compound word was likely coined by Irish monks from the Latin word "longus" (long) reflecting the Old Norse "lang" (long), thus implying "langskip" (long ship); plus the Latin "portus", meaning port, harbour. There are several towns and townlands in Ireland whose names bear some element of Longphort in them. This may suggest that at some point in history there may have been a longphort situated there, as is attested in some examples.

The town and county of Longford are anglicisations of the Irish equivalent "longfort", referring to a fortress or fortified house.

References 

Viking Age in Ireland
Viking Age populated places